Roberto Maggioni (born 5 March 1968) is an Italian former cyclist. He competed in the team time trial at the 1988 Summer Olympics.

References

External links
 

1968 births
Living people
Italian male cyclists
Olympic cyclists of Italy
Cyclists at the 1988 Summer Olympics
Sportspeople from Lecco
Cyclists from the Province of Lecco